Shivanand Siddaramgouda Patil is an Indian politician from the state of Karnataka. He was also a minister in Second H. D. Kumaraswamy ministry.

Constituency
He represents the Basavana Bagevadi constituency.

References

External links 
  Karnataka Legislative Assembly

Living people
Karnataka MLAs 2018–2023
1964 births
Indian National Congress politicians from Karnataka